Silence Is the Answer is an album by composer Deuter, released in 1981 through Kuckuck Schallplatten.

Track listing

Personnel
Deuter – flute, guitar, recorder,  synthesizer, production
Carol Mersereau – photography
Eckart Rahn – photography
Hermann Wernhard – design
Klaus Wiese – tamboura

References

1981 albums
Deuter albums
Kuckuck Schallplatten albums